Section 124 of the Constitution of Australia provides a constitutional provision for creating new Australian States.

See also
 List of proposed states of Australia

References

External links
 Section 124 of the Constitution of Australia at Australasian Legal Information Institute website

Australian constitutional law